Elisabeth of Austria is a 1931 German historical drama film directed by Adolf Trotz and starring Lil Dagover, Paul Otto, and Maria Matray. It is a biopic of Empress Elisabeth of Austria. It was shot at the EFA Studios in Berlin with sets designed by the art director Franz Schroedter.

Plot
Empress Elizabeth of Austria (Lil Dagover) is a free spirit expected to conform herself in a regal manner and wed to Franz Joseph (Paul Otto) . Elizabeth cannot stand her royal life and all its protocol and decided to run away from the royal court to live a carefree existence among the people.

Cast

References

Bibliography

External links

Overview

1931 films
1930s biographical drama films
1930s historical drama films
German biographical drama films
German historical drama films
Films of the Weimar Republic
1930s German-language films
Films directed by Adolf Trotz
Films set in Austria
Films set in the 19th century
Biographical films about Austrian royalty
Cultural depictions of Empress Elisabeth of Austria
Cultural depictions of Franz Joseph I of Austria
German black-and-white films
1931 drama films
Films set in the Austrian Empire
1930s German films
Films shot at Halensee Studios